JP1 may refer to:

 JP1 remote, a universal remote
 Joss JP1, an Australian supercar
 JP-1, Jet Propellant 1, an early jet fuel
 Pope John Paul I
 Jurassic Park (film), the 1993 film, first in the Jurassic Park film series
 JP1, Hitachi's System Management Software

See also
 JP (disambiguation)